Milan Ciganović (18881 September 1927) was a Serbian revolutionary and one of the main organizers of the assassination of Archduke Franz Ferdinand in 1914.

Born in Bosanski Petrovac, Ciganović later moved to Belgrade where he joined the Black Hand. Ciganović played an important role in the assassination of the Austrian Archduke Franz Ferdinand because he delivered four revolvers, six bombs and a bottle of poison to Nedeljko Čabrinović, Gavrilo Princip and Trifko Grabež. Following the assassination, the Serbian government sent Ciganović to the United States for his safety during World War I. He returned home in 1919 and received a land award from the government, married and settled down as a farmer.

He died on 1 September 1927 in Trubarevo.

References 

1888 births
1927 deaths
Serbian revolutionaries
People from Bosanski Petrovac
Serbs of Bosnia and Herzegovina